Čadramska Vas is a village in the Municipality of Poljčane in northeastern Slovenia. It lies on the left bank of the Dravinja River, just west of the town of Poljčane. The main railway line from Ljubljana to Maribor runs through the settlement. The area is part of the traditional region of Styria. It is now included with the rest of the municipality in the Drava Statistical Region.

References

External links
 
Čadramska Vas on Geopedia

Populated places in the Municipality of Poljčane